Songs that reached number one on the Billboard Adult Top 40 chart during the 2000s, listed in chronological order. The top song of 2000, "Smooth", spent a record 25 weeks at number one on the chart beginning in October 1999 and continuing through April 2000.

Chart history

See also
 2000s in music

References

Lists of number-one songs in the United States
United States Adult Top 40
2000s in American music